Dampınar is a village in the District of Germencik, Aydın Province, Turkey. As of the 2010 Turkish Census, it had a population of 381 people.

References

Villages in Germencik District